The Lycée Français de Lomé (LFL) is a French international school in Nyékonakpoé, Lomé, Togo. It includes primaire (primary), collège (junior high school), and lycée (senior high school) levels.

Its current primary school facility, école Charles-de-Gaulle, opened in 2016.

See also 

 List of international schools
 Education in Togo

References

External links
 Lycée Français de Lomé
 Lycée Français de Lomé  (old website)

Schools in Lomé
International schools in Togo
French international schools in Africa